The 2002 National Indoor Football League season was the second season of the National Indoor Football League (NIFL). The league champions were the Ohio Valley Greyhounds, who defeated the Billings Outlaws in Indoor Bowl II.

Standings

 Green indicates clinched playoff berth
 Purple indicates division champion
 Grey indicates best conference record

Playoffs
Round 1
 Lake Charles 42, Tennessee 40
 Ohio Valley 51, Louisiana 32
 Bismarck 69, Omaha 40
 Billings 54, Lincoln 51

Semifinals
 Ohio Valley 54, Tennessee 24
 Billings 59, Bismarck 56

Indoor Bowl II
 Ohio Valley 55, Billings 52

External links
 2002 NIFL Season Stats

National Indoor Football League seasons
National League Football League